"I Lost on Jeopardy" is a song by American musician "Weird Al" Yankovic from his second album, "Weird Al" Yankovic in 3-D, released in 1984. The song is a parody of "Jeopardy" by The Greg Kihn Band, released in 1983, and its refrain "Our love's in jeopardy". The parody's lyrics center on the game show Jeopardy!, and features a guest vocal from Don Pardo, who announced for Jeopardy! from 1964 to 1975. The music video uses a set inspired by the game show, and in addition to Pardo, features cameos from the show's host Art Fleming as well as Dr. Demento and Greg Kihn. The song was released just prior to the revival of Jeopardy! in 1984, though contrary to popular theory, the revival was already in the works and was not inspired by Yankovic's song.

The song has appeared on several compilation albums, including "Weird Al" Yankovic's Greatest Hits (1988), Wacky Favorites (1993), and Permanent Record: Al in the Box (1994).
The song charted at 83 on the Hot 100.

Track listing

7" single 
 "I Lost on Jeopardy" – 3:26
 "I'll Be Mellow When I'm Dead" – 3:37

12" promo single 
 "I Lost on Jeopardy" – 5:31 (Extended Mix).
 "Mr. Popeil" – 4:40

Music video

Production
The video was directed by Jay Levey, and produced by Robert K. Weiss, and filmed on May 24 and 25, 1984. The video loosely parodies the music video for "Jeopardy". The video takes place on a set loosely based on the 1964-75 version of the quiz show Jeopardy! and depicts a "behind-the-scenes" look at the show; in addition to Pardo appearing on-camera, the video features cameo appearances by original Jeopardy! host Art Fleming, Yankovic's mentor, Dr. Demento, members of Yankovic's band, his real-life parents and a brief cameo by Greg Kihn at the end. (Jeopardy! had last aired in 1979; it was being prepared for a modernized relaunch at the time the song was recorded and released, though Fleming had already declined to return as host.)

Synopsis
As the video begins, a nervous Yankovic finds himself pitted against a plumber and an architect, both of whom have Ph.D. diplomas that they show to him on stage. After host Art Fleming enters, he reveals the game board and its six categories: "T.V. Themes", "Nuclear Physics", "World Geography", "Food", "Potpourri", and "Famous Accordion Players", all of which contain a series of befuddling and nearly-impossible clues. Although the other two contestants effortlessly give many correct responses, Yankovic cannot and eventually gives up instead.

Announcer Don Pardo proceeds to tell Yankovic what he did not win: a set of encyclopedias, a case of Turtle Wax, and a year's supply of Rice-A-Roni. Pardo then throws some papers and tells Yankovic that he has disgraced himself to the audience and his family. Yankovic's podium begins to break down as his score continues to plummet in the negative column, while Pardo announces that he will not come back the next day, nor receive "a lousy copy of our home game", and that he is a "complete loser" as the camera zooms in on the game board, with the money cards replaced with cards reading "complete loser".

Fleming raspberries and gives two thumbs down to Yankovic, who rips off a piece of wood from his podium as two stagehands forcibly grab him and literally throw him out from the studio. Yankovic comments in his song's lyrics that he hopes he will do better "next weekend on The Price Is Right". At the end of the video, Yankovic lands in the back seat of an Alfa Romeo Spider convertible driven by Greg Kihn himself, with the license plate reading "LOSER".

References to Greg Kihn's "Jeopardy" video
As two stagehands forcibly grab him to throw him out from the studio, Yankovic rips off a piece of wood from his podium. In the original "Jeopardy" video, Kihn tears up a piece of wood from one of the pews, where the monster pulled him into the center of the church. 
Yankovic lands in the back seat of an Alfa Romeo Spider convertible driven by Kihn himself, with the license plate reading "LOSER". In the original "Jeopardy" video, Kihn drives away from a wedding with a bride in an MG MGB convertible, with the license plate reading "LIPS". According to Kihn, he described his car as "a vintage sports car to approximate the one I drove in the original 'Jeopardy' video".

Chart positions

Use on Jeopardy!
The song's release in 1984 preceded the revival of the game show later that year with Alex Trebek (1984-2021) , and currently Ken Jennings (since January 2021) and Mayim Bialik (since May 2021), as its host. Yankovic has stated that he had heard stories that the popularity of his song led the show's creator and producer, Merv Griffin, to launch the revival. However, the revival of Jeopardy! was being sold to television stations in syndication and promoted at the National Association of Television Program Executives convention in February 1984, before Yankovic's song was released to the public on an album or single or as a music video.

The song has been referenced several times on the new Jeopardy! itself, including once as a category, and later when Yankovic appeared on Rock & Roll Jeopardy!. It was the subject of an Audio Daily Double on October 23, 1984, when the contestant who got the clue was asked to identify the artist of the song from an audio sample of the song but failed to do so, the subject of a Daily Double on the April 27, 2012 episode of the show, with the contestant receiving the clue—which consisted of the release year and some lyrics—failing to identify the song, and the subject of a Daily Double on the March 15, 2018 episode of the show, in which the contestant receiving the clue—which consisted of a part of the lyrics—succeeded in identifying the singer. The song was played over the closing credits on the second episode of Rock & Roll Jeopardy! on which Yankovic appeared.  On the August 13, 2021 episode, host Joe Buck read the answer in "Lost" for $1,200: "Art Fleming and Don Pardo were in the video for this Weird Al parody song."  Seventeen-day champion Matt Amodio correctly asked, "What's 'I Lost on Jeopardy!'?" Buck responded, "Yes, and don't sing it; it will not leave your head, it's been in mine for three weeks."

See also 
 List of singles by "Weird Al" Yankovic
 List of songs by "Weird Al" Yankovic

References 

1984 singles
1984 songs
Jeopardy!
Quizzes and game shows in popular culture
Scotti Brothers Records singles
Songs about television
Songs with lyrics by "Weird Al" Yankovic
Songs written by Greg Kihn
"Weird Al" Yankovic songs